The Saudi Council of Economic and Development Affairs is one of two subcabinets of the Kingdom of Saudi Arabia. It was established by King Salman to replace the Supreme Economic Council, and is led by the King Salman’s son and Crown Prince Mohammad bin Salman, who holds additional roles such as Defense minister.

History 
The fall in oil prices in 2014, coupled with developing security threats led King Salman bin Abdulaziz Al Saud to reshuffle the existing cabinet structure and staff. On 29 January 2015, days after assuming the throne, King Salman bin Abdulaziz ordered major changes to government including a cabinet reshuffle, via royal decree. He replaced a dozen existing cabinets, or advisory bodies, with two new ones: the Council of Political and Security Affairs, and the Council of Economic and Development Affairs, in order to improve efficiency in the government’s decision-making apparatus.

Each year, a meeting is chaired by the crown prince to review and assess the Council’s actions and decisions. Following an inaugural session in February 2015, review sessions were held in February 2016 and 2017: the first included briefs made by the Project Management Office (within CEDA) and the second featured briefs by the Ministry of Energy, Industry and Mineral Resources as well as the Minister of Justice, on improving their respective entities’ outputs, to be in line with the kingdom’s Vision 2030.

Structure and function 
The Council of Economic and Development Affairs aims at establishing the overall governance, the mechanisms and measures necessary to achieve Saudi Vision 2030. The body addresses issues spanning all Saudi domestic affairs, from health, labor, education and Islamic affairs.

The council shall also make decisions on any matter under its jurisdiction that could prevent programs from achieving their goals. Several dedicated committees and management offices have been set up. The council breaks down the roles and responsibilities of the relevant government agencies and mechanisms, including a strategic committee and an office of strategic management.

Membership

References

Government agencies of Saudi Arabia